Isitolo Maka (born 25 May 1975) is a former rugby union footballer for the All Blacks playing as a number 8 and making four appearances, all in 1998. Maka was the coach of the Tonga squad at the 2011 Rugby World Cup. 

Whilst at Toulouse he helped them win the 2005 Heineken Cup, featuring as a replacement in the final.

References

External links

1975 births
Living people
New Zealand international rugby union players
New Zealand rugby union players
New Zealand rugby union coaches
Stade Toulousain players
Tongan emigrants to New Zealand
New Zealand expatriate rugby union players
Expatriate rugby union players in France
New Zealand expatriate sportspeople in France
Expatriate rugby union players in Japan
New Zealand expatriate sportspeople in Japan
Blues (Super Rugby) players
Highlanders (rugby union) players
Chiefs (rugby union) players
Rugby union number eights
Tongan rugby union players
Tongan expatriate rugby union players
Tongan expatriate sportspeople in Japan
Tongan expatriate sportspeople in France
People from Tongatapu